Aes Dana is a French Celtic/black metal band, based in Paris, France. The name of the band is Old Irish for "people of the arts".

The band mix black metal features like growling vocals or heavy guitar sound with traditional Celtic instruments like Irish flute or bombard.
These characteristics, coming from the various influences of the band's early members (death metal, black metal, grindcore, but also folk music), give a very particular touch to their music
.

Their lyrics (in French in their last albums) often deal with Celtic mythology.

Biography
Aes Dana was formed in 1994, with Taliesin (guitar) and Amorgen (Irish flute), soon joined by Vidar (vocals), Storm (drums), and Christophe (bass). Their first demo, Chroniques du crépuscule, was considered by the band as being atmospheric black metal.

In 1997 and 1999, Christophe was replaced by Milambre, and Storm by JuanJolocaust, and Seth join Taliesin as second guitarist.

They recorded in French their first full-length album in 2000. Seth Left the band the same year, later to be replaced by Tilion.

Following 2000, the band started to add new traditional instruments such as the bombard to their music. They recorded their second album La chasse sauvage, in 2001, and their third Formors, in 2005.

Until 2005, the band had the particularity to have as many women as men in its line-up (Amorgen, Taliesin, and Milambre versus Vidar, JuanJolocaust, and Tilion). According to the band, it was not a deliberate decision, but just the product of chance.

In 2006, Hades left to be replaced by Myrddin. In 2008, Taliesin came back to replace Benoit, and Iréel replaced Tilion.

Band members

Last known line-up
 Taliesin - guitars (1994-2005, 2008-present)
 Vidar - vocals (1994-present)
 Milambre - bass (1997-present)
 Myrddin - tin whistle, bombard (2005-present)
 Iréel - guitars (2010-present)
 Wilfrid Rodel - drums (2011-present)

Former members
 Tomaz Boucherifi-Kadiou - tin whistle, bombard (1997-1998)
 Storm - drums (1994-1999)
 Amorgen - flute, tin whistle (1994-1997, 1998-2005)
 Christophe - bass (1996-1997)
 Seth - guitars (1997-2000)
 Juan Jolocaust - drums (1999-2009)
 Tilion - guitars (2000-2009)
 Hades - flute (2005)
 Aegir - guitars (2005-2008)

Timeline

Discography
 Chroniques du crépuscule (demo, 1997)
 Promo CD (demo, 2000)
 La chasse sauvage (2001)
 Formors (2005)

References

External links
 Official website
 Official Myspace

French black metal musical groups
Celtic metal musical groups
Musical groups established in 1994
1994 establishments in France
Musical groups from Paris